Carlos Eduardo Santos Oliveira (born 20 November 1986), known as Eduardo, is a Brazilian footballer who plays as a right back for Sport Recife.

Biography
Eduardo was signed by Vasco in December 2006. He was loaned to Duque de Caxias along with Madson in January 2008 for 2008 Campeonato Carioca. In January 2009 he was transferred to CSA, signed a contract until the end of 2009 Campeonato Alagoano. In February, he was signed by Guaratinguetá until the end of 2009 Campeonato Paulista. In May, he joined Confiança for 2009 Série C. He was signed by River Plate de Carmópolis in August, winning 2009 Campeonato Sergipano Segunda Divisão.

In January 2010 he was signed by Joinville in 1-year contract. He extended the deal in November.

Honours 
River Plate-SE
Campeonato Sergipano Segunda Divisão: 2009

Joinville
 Copa Santa Catarina: 2011, 2012, 2013
 Campeonato Brasileiro Série C: 2011

Atlético Paranaense
 Campeonato Paranaense: 2016

Bahia
Copa do Nordeste: 2017

Ceará
Copa do Nordeste: 2020

References

External links
 Futpedia profile 
 CBF profile  
 
 

1986 births
Living people
People from Maceió
Brazilian footballers
Association football fullbacks
Campeonato Brasileiro Série A players
Campeonato Brasileiro Série B players
Campeonato Brasileiro Série C players
Campeonato Brasileiro Série D players
Clube de Regatas Brasil players
CR Vasco da Gama players
Duque de Caxias Futebol Clube players
Centro Sportivo Alagoano players
Guaratinguetá Futebol players
Associação Desportiva Confiança players
River Atlético Clube players
Joinville Esporte Clube players
Criciúma Esporte Clube players
Club Athletico Paranaense players
Esporte Clube Bahia players
Associação Chapecoense de Futebol players
Ceará Sporting Club players
América Futebol Clube (MG) players
Sportspeople from Alagoas